Jonny Hanssen (born 13 December 1972) is a retired Norwegian football midfielder.

Hanssen became a manager, coaching Frognerparken FK, Frigg Oslo FK, IF Ready, Hasle-Løren IL, Løten FK and from 2020 Raumnes og Årnes IL.

References

1972 births
Living people
People from Narvik
Norwegian footballers
FK Mjølner players
Tromsø IL players
S.C. Eendracht Aalst players
Lyn Fotball players
Aarhus Gymnastikforening players
Drøbak-Frogn IL players
Norwegian First Division players
Eliteserien players
Belgian Pro League players
Danish Superliga players
Association football midfielders
Norway international footballers
Norwegian expatriate footballers
Expatriate footballers in Belgium
Norwegian expatriate sportspeople in Belgium
Expatriate men's footballers in Denmark
Norwegian expatriate sportspeople in Denmark
Norwegian football managers
Sportspeople from Nordland